The Ellipse, sometimes referred to as President's Park South, is a  park south of the White House fence and north of Constitution Avenue and the National Mall in Washington, D.C. The Ellipse is also the name of the  circumference street within the park. The entire park, which features monuments, is open to the public and is part of President's Park. The Ellipse is the location for many annual events.

From a mathematical point of view, the Ellipse is truly an ellipse.

History

18th century
In 1791, the first plan for the park was drawn up by Pierre Charles L'Enfant. The Ellipse was known as "the White Lot" due to the whitewashed wooden fence that enclosed the park.

19th century

During the American Civil War, the grounds of the Ellipse and the incomplete Washington Monument were used as corrals for horses, mules, and cattle, and as camp sites for Union troops.

In 1860, the Ellipse was the regular playing field for the Washington Senators and was the site of the first game between the Senators and the Washington Nationals. In 1865, the Nationals hosted a baseball tournament with the Philadelphia Athletics, for which viewing stands were built and admission was charged. Black baseball teams such as the Washington Mutuals and the Washington Alerts often used the White Lot until Blacks were banned from using the Ellipse in 1874.

The Army Corps of Engineers began work on the Ellipse in 1867. The park was landscaped in 1879, and American Elms were planted around the existing portion of the roadway. In 1880, grading was begun and the Ellipse was created from what had been a common dump. In 1894, the Ellipse roadway was lit with electric lamps.

In the 1890s, Congress authorized the use of the Ellipse grounds by special groups, including religious meetings and military encampments. As late as 1990, baseball fields and tennis courts existed in the park. Sporting events and demonstrations are still held on the Ellipse. President's Park South came under the jurisdiction of the National Park Service in 1933.

20th century
On Christmas Eve 1923, President Calvin Coolidge started an unbroken tradition by lighting the first "National Christmas Tree." The first tree, a cut balsam fir, was placed on the Ellipse by the District of Columbia Public Schools.  From 1924 to 1953, live trees in various locations around and on the White House grounds were lit on Christmas Eve. In 1954, the ceremony returned to the Ellipse and with an expanded focus: the "Christmas Pageant of Peace." From 1954 through 1972, cut trees were used, but in 1973 a Colorado blue spruce from York, Pennsylvania was planted on the Ellipse.  A replacement was planted in 1978.

On August 10, 1933, the Ellipse was transferred to the National Park Service, the legal successor of three federal commissioners appointed by the President under an act of July 16, 1790, which directed initial construction.  Their authority developed through acts of May 1, 1802; April 19, 1816; March 3, 1849; March 2, 1867; July 1, 1898; February 26, 1925; March 3, 1933; and Executive Order of June 10, 1933.  Under act of September 22, 1961, "the White House shall be administered pursuant to the act of August 25, 1916" and supplementary and amendatory acts.  This NPS area was originally referred to simply as "The White House."

In 1942, during World War II, the National Park Service granted permission for the construction of barracks as a special emergency war-time measure. The temporary barracks were erected on the south side of the Old Executive Office Building and the entire First Division Monument grounds. The "White House Barracks" were demolished in 1954.

21st century
On January 6, 2021, President Donald Trump delivered a speech to his supporters gathered around the Ellipse about Congress confirming the Electoral College votes following  the November 2020 presidential election.

Memorials
 Boy Scout Memorial by Donald De Lue
 Bulfinch Gatehouses by Charles Bulfinch
 Butt-Millet Memorial Fountain by Daniel Chester French
 Ellipse Meridian Stone, located under the surface near the center of the Ellipse, commemorates President Thomas Jefferson's idea of an American prime meridian.
 Enid Haupt Fountains
 First Division Monument by Daniel Chester French
 National Menorah (seasonal)
 National Christmas Tree
 Second Division Memorial by James Earle Fraser
 Settlers of the District of Columbia Memorial
 Zero Milestone by Horace W. Peaslee

Events

Annual events on the Ellipse include the Christmas Pageant of Peace and formerly the "Twilight Tattoo" military pageant. From 1992 to 2005, it was the site for the commencement ceremony for The George Washington University. It is also the queueing location for the annual White House Easter Egg Roll and the White House garden tours. Under the auspices of the National Park Service, the Capital Alumni Network and a number of neighborhood and military sports leagues play softball and flag football games on the grounds of the Ellipse. A number of ultimate competitions are also held by various groups throughout the warmer months.

The Ellipse Visitor Pavilion, opened for visitors in May 1994, distributes free tickets for special events at the White House such as the Easter Egg Roll and the fall and spring Garden Tours. It includes an information window, concession area, restrooms, telephones, water fountains, and a first aid area, all accessible.

References

External links

 The White House
 White House Historical Association
 "The Shape and History of The Ellipse in Washington, D.C.", by Clark Kimberling, University of Evansville 

1790 establishments in the United States
National Park Service areas in Washington, D.C.
Parks in Washington, D.C.
President's Park
White House